The Joseph M. Margiotta Distinguished Service Award is presented annually by Hofstra University in recognition of extraordinary dedication, generosity and service to the Hofstra Athletics Pride Club and Hofstra Athletics. The award is named for Joseph Margiotta, a Hofstra student-athlete and long-time supporter of the university.

Margiotta founded the Hofstra Pride Club. He served as its president for more than 20 years.

Award Winners by Year

References

Hofstra University